Cristina López (born 8 July 1975) is a Spanish handball player.

She was born in Cádiz, Spain. She competed at the 2004 Summer Olympics, where Spain finished 6th.

References

1975 births
Living people
Sportspeople from Cádiz
Spanish female handball players
Olympic handball players of Spain
Handball players at the 2004 Summer Olympics